Garcinia holttumii is a species of flowering plant in the family Clusiaceae. It is endemic to Peninsular Malaysia.

References

holttumii
Endemic flora of Peninsular Malaysia
Vulnerable plants
Taxonomy articles created by Polbot